Mount Saskatchewan is a mountain located in the North Saskatchewan River valley of Banff National Park, in the Canadian Rockies of Alberta, Canada.

J. Norman Collie named the mountain in 1898 for the nearby Saskatchewan River. One report said Collie so named it due to its possession of the headwaters of the North Saskatchewan River.

Lighthouse Tower

A  pinnacle unofficially named Lighthouse Tower and also sometimes referred to as "Cleopatra's Needle" (elevation ), is located two kilometres from the summit on the eastern ridge of Mt. Saskatchewan. 

It was first climbed in 1964 by G. Boehnisch and L. Mackay.

Geology
Like other mountains in Banff Park, Mount Saskatchewan is composed of sedimentary rock laid down from the Precambrian to Jurassic periods. Formed in shallow seas, this sedimentary rock was pushed east and over the top of younger rock during the Laramide orogeny. The north aspect of the peak supports an unnamed glacier which can be seen well from Parker Ridge.

Climate
Based on the Köppen climate classification, Mount Saskatchewan is located in a subarctic climate with cold, snowy winters, and mild summers.

See also
 List of mountains of Canada
 List of mountains in the Canadian Rockies

References

External links
 Parks Canada web site: Banff National Park
 Mount Saskatchewan weather: Mountain Forecast

Three-thousanders of Alberta
Mountains of Banff National Park